Associação Recreativa, Cultural e Desportiva Junqueira Futebol Clube - A.R.C.D.J.F.C. Is an amateur futsal team based in Santa Cruz do Bispo, Portugal. It plays in Portuguese Futsal First Division.

External links
 www.junqueirafc.com

Futsal clubs in Portugal
Association football clubs established in 1969
1969 establishments in Portugal